Frances is a given name, the feminine version of Francis.

Frances may also refer to:

Places
 Frances, Indiana, an unincorporated community
 Frances, Kentucky, an unincorporated community
 Frances, Washington, an unincorporated community
 Frances, South Australia, a town

Ships
 Frances (ship), several ships
 USS Frances, two ships of the United States Navy

Other uses
 Frances (horse), a New Zealand racehorse
 Frances (film), a 1982 film starring Jessica Lange as actress Frances Farmer
 Hurricane Frances (disambiguation), various cyclones
 Frances, the Allied code name for the Japanese Yokosuka P1Y bomber of the Second World War
 Frances (musician) (born 1993), English singer and songwriter
 Frances (1811 cricketer), first name unknown

See also
 Francesca, another form of name "Frances"
 Francesco, Francis, Franciscus, Frank, male forms of name "Frances"